In analytic philosophy, the paradigm case argument is an argument which is applied as a rebuttal to the claim that certain concepts, such as free will or knowledge are meaningless. The paradigm case argument is that if a term, such as "knowledge", is regularly applied to some cases and not to others, then that term (and the concept it refers to) cannot truly be undefined, as it clearly has some kind of definition in practice. The argument is so named because it often takes the form of pointing out a paradigm case—a case which unambiguously falls under the common definition of the term, and so can be taken as a definite instance of the supposedly non-existent concept. This argument was commonly applied during the flourishing of linguistic philosophy.

References

Analytic philosophy
Philosophical arguments
Semantics
Philosophy of language

External links
 Internet Encyclopedia of Philosophy